The 2018 Guam FA Cup is the 11th season of the Guam FA Cup knockout tournament.

The tournament was played between 1 and 30 June 2018. In the final, Bank of Guam Strykers FC defeated Rovers FC 5–1 at the Guam Football Association National Training Center.

See also
2017–18 Guam Soccer League

References

External links

Guam FA Cup News

Football competitions in Guam
Guam
FA Cup